Conrad Westermayr (30 January 1765, Hanau - 5 October 1834, Hanau) was a German painter and copper engraver.

Life and work 
His father, Daniel Jacob Westermayr (1734–1788), was a goldsmith. At first, he focused on creating portraits, as the best source of income. In 1788, he enrolled at the Kunsthochschule Kassel, to continue his studies with one of the numerous members of the Tischbein family; most likely Johann Heinrich Tischbein. His first oil paintings were copies of the Old Masters.

After 1791, he studied in Weimar, with the copper engraver, Johann Heinrich Lips. Later, he made engraved copies of larger works by other artists, and worked for the publishing house, "Industrie-Kontor", owned by  Friedrich Justin Bertuch. He went to Dresden in 1795, to further his skills in landscape painting. In 1800, he returned to Weimar and married , an artist who had also worked for Bertuch.

He was named a professor at the Hanau Academy in 1806. The old city gates were demolished that year, and his drawings provide the only visual record of them. Not long after, he became the academy's Director, a position he held for the rest of his life. In 1813, he made several paintings and engravings of the Battle of Hanau.

Despite these activities, his focus was on promoting his students. These included Moritz Daniel Oppenheim, considered to be one of the first modern Jewish painters.

He died in 1834, at the age of sixty-nine. He and Henriette had no children.

Sources 
 
 Norbert Nail: "Semper lustig. Nunquam traurig: Marburger Studenten im Stammbuch des Conrad Westermayr", In: Alma Mater Philippina. Sommersemester 1994, pp. 22–25
 Georg Kaspar Nagler, "Westermayr, Conrad", In: Neues allgemeines Künstler-Lexicon, Vol.24, Schwarzenberg & Schumann, 1835, pp. 186–188 (Online)
 Ina Schneider: "Conrad und Henriette Westermayr – Leben und Arbeiten in Weimar und Hanau", In: Neues Magazin für Hanauische Geschichte, 1996, pp. 2–34

External links 

1765 births
1834 deaths
German painters
German engravers
German illustrators
People from Hanau